Unione Sportiva Dilettantistica San Severo is an Italian association football club based in San Severo, Apulia. The club currently plays in Serie D.

History

Foundation
The club was founded in 1922.

Serie D
In the season 2012–13 the team was promoted for the second time, from Eccellenza Apulia to Serie D.

Colours and badge
The team's colours are red and yellow.

Honours
Eccellenza:
Winner (2): 1993–1994 and 2012–13

References

External links
Official website 

Football clubs in Apulia
San Severo
Association football clubs established in 1922
1922 establishments in Italy